The ninth series of the British medical drama television series Casualty commenced airing in the United Kingdom on BBC One on 17 September 1994 and finished on 25 March 1995.

Cast

Overview
The ninth series of Casualty features a cast of characters working in the emergency department of Holby City Hospital. Only 5 of the regular cast from the previous series were retained. Clive Mantle starred as emergency medicine consultant Mike Barratt. Derek Thompson continued his role as clinical nurse manager Charlie Fairhead. Patrick Robinson and Jane Gurnett appeared as charge nurse Martin "Ash" Ashford and staff nurse Rachel Longworth. Ian Bleasdale portrayed paramedic Josh Griffiths. The series initially met with negative responses from some viewers due a key visual change - the switch from the videotape visual style to a 'filmic' look. Many felt the grainy new visuals lacked the immediacy and clarity of videotape. The filmic effect was added in post-production, but was removed after a few weeks so that all remaining episodes in the series reverted to the familiar videotape look. The filmic style was reinstated at the start of series 22 in September 2007, and has remained the standard visual style of the series ever since.

Joan Oliver, Sorcha Cusack, Steven Brand and Jason Merrells were introduced in episode one as senior house officer Eddie Gordon, senior staff nurse Kate Wilson, staff nurse Adam Cooke and receptionist Matt Hawley. Lisa Coleman and Sue Devaney were also introduced throughout the series as staff nurse Jude Korcanik and paramedic Liz Harker respectively. They made their first appearances in episodes two and ten respectively. Colette Brown appeared in three episodes of the series as Adam's former wife Emma Quinn. Julia Watson decided to reprise her role of Barbara "Baz" Hayes, now a locum emergency medicine consultant. Watson had last appeared on the show at the conclusion of the first series and returned in episode twenty. Oliver and Brand departed at the conclusion of the series.

Main characters 
Ian Bleasdale as Josh Griffiths
Steven Brand as Adam Cooke (episodes 1−24)
Lisa Coleman as Jude Korcanik (from episode 2)
Sorcha Cusack as Kate Wilson (from episode 1)
Sue Devaney as Liz Harker (from episode 10)
Jane Gurnett as Rachel Longworth
Clive Mantle as Mike Barratt
Jason Merrells as Matt Hawley (from episode 1)
Joan Oliver as Eddie Gordon (episodes 1−24)
Patrick Robinson as Martin "Ash" Ashford
Derek Thompson as Charlie Fairhead
Julia Watson as Barbara "Baz" Hayes (from episode 20)

Recurring and guest characters 
Colette Brown as Emma Quinn (episodes 6−15)
Frank Grimes as Brian Hawley (episode 17)

Episodes

References

External links
 Casualty series 9 at the Internet Movie Database

09
1994 British television seasons
1995 British television seasons